The 1892 Crescent Athletic Club football team was an American football team that represented the Crescent Athletic Club in the American Football Union (AFU) during the 1892 college football season. The team played its home games at Eastern Park in Brooklyn, compiled a 2–3–1 record, and won the AFU championship. Harry Beecher, who played for Yale from 1884 to 1887, was the Crescent team's quarterback and captain.

Schedule

References

Crescent Athletic Club
Crescent Athletic Club football seasons
Crescent Athletic Club Football